The following are the national records in speed skating in Colombia maintained by the Colombia Federation of Skating Sports.

Men

Women

References

External links
 Colombia Federation of Skating Sports website

National records in speed skating
Speed skating-related lists
Speed skating in South America
Speed skating
Speed skating